Pogradec District was one of the 36 districts of Albania, which were dissolved in July 2000 and replaced by 12 newly created counties. It is in the east of the country, and its capital was the city of Pogradec.

Administrative divisions
The district consisted of the following municipalities:
Buçimas
Çërravë
Dardhas
Pogradec
Proptisht
Trebinjë
Udënisht
Velçan

Note: - urban municipalities in bold

Places

Alarup
Blacë
Bletas
Mëmëlisht
Peshkëpi
Pogradec
Udënisht

References

External links 
Pogradec.info

City of Pogradec
Explore Pogradec
Pogradec travel information

Districts of Albania
Geography of Korçë County